Cerithiopsis jeffreysi is a species of sea snail, a gastropod in the family Cerithiopsidae, which is known from the Caribbean Sea and European oceans. It was described by Watson in 1885.

References

jeffreysi
Gastropods described in 1885